Time Residences is a 30-storey,  skyscraper project that proposed for construction in Dubai, United Arab Emirates.  The AED400 million, 200 unit project was planned for completion in 2012 but was subsequently delayed due to the financial crises.  

Time Residences would have been the first skyscraper in the world to fully rotate 360 degrees, powered by a solar power plant at the base of the tower. The entire 80,000 tonne structure will complete one full rotation through 360 degrees over a one-week period which would have totalled 52 degrees in one day. The building would have had 12 o'clock markings on the structure, allowing the skyscraper to become a fully functioning timepiece. This has led to the saying that this skyscraper would have been the world's largest gadget. The skyscraper would be a "Green" building, as the building would have use recycled water to water its gardens and solar power to rotate.

See also
List of tallest buildings in Dubai
Da Vinci Tower

References

External links

Unbuilt buildings and structures in Dubai